Miguel Marcelo Brizuela (born 5 January 1997) is an Argentine professional footballer who plays as a centre-back for Vélez Sarsfield.

Career
Brizuela had a short stint with River Plate, prior to penning terms with Vélez Sarsfield's ranks. He is a product of the latter's academy, with their former youth captain making a first-team breakthrough in mid-2019 under manager Gabriel Heinze. His professional debut arrived on 28 July 2019, as the centre-back was selected to start a Primera División fixture away to Talleres; he played fifty-nine minutes, before being subbed off for Pablo Galdames in an eventual 1–0 loss at the Estadio Mario Alberto Kempes. Brizuela scored his first goal on 3 January 2021 against Newell's Old Boys in the Copa de la Liga Profesional.

Personal life
On 9 February 2021, Brizuela was charged - along with Vélez teammate Thiago Almada - with the rape of a 28-year-old woman; which allegedly occurred at a party on 3 December 2020, which was hosted by teammate Juan Martín Lucero to celebrate Vélez advancing in the Copa Sudamericana. Juan José Acosta Delbene, a former manager of Defensa y Justicia's reserves and Argentino, was initially the only person charged. However, in early February, prosecutor Laura Zyseskind charged initial witnesses Brizuela and Almada; while Delbene was on the run. It is claimed that those two, plus Delbene and an unnamed woman, were involved. Two other women, who were later apprehended, reportedly stole items from the victim.

In response to the charging of Brizuela and Almada, Vélez Sarsfield announced on 9 February that both players had been removed from the first-team until the case was concluded. However, the two players were reincorporated into the senior set-up on 16 February after the club claimed to have received new evidence and further information on the case - though the victim's lawyer, Raquel Hermida Leyenda, stated that nothing had changed in the intervening period. Brizuela played and scored a day later against Deportivo Camioneros in the Copa Argentina.

Career statistics
.

Notes

References

External links

1997 births
Living people
People from Moreno Partido
Argentine footballers
Association football defenders
Argentine Primera División players
Club Atlético Vélez Sarsfield footballers
Sportspeople from Buenos Aires Province